Chen Zhifang (1906 – December 15, 1990) was a Chinese diplomat. He was Ambassador of the People's Republic of China to Syria (1956–1958), Iraq (1958–1960), Uganda (1964–1970), Switzerland (1970–1975) and Vietnam (1977–1978). He was a delegate to the 5th National People's Congress.

1906 births
1990 deaths
Politicians of the People's Republic of China
Ambassadors of China to Syria
Ambassadors of China to Iraq
Ambassadors of China to Uganda
Ambassadors of China to Switzerland
Ambassadors of China to Vietnam
Delegates to the 5th National People's Congress
Place of birth missing